Dalpat Singh Paraste (30 May 1950 – 1 June 2016) was a member of the 14th Lok Sabha of India. He represented the Shahdol constituency of Madhya Pradesh and was a member of the Bharatiya Janata Party political party. He was four times MP from Shahdol.

He was denied ticket by the BJP in the 2009 elections. He died on 1 June 2016 at a Medanta Hospital due to brain hemorrhage in Gurgaon, where he was admitted on 27 May.

References

External links
 Members of Fourteenth Lok Sabha - Parliament of India website

1950 births
2016 deaths
Janata Dal politicians
Bharatiya Janata Party politicians from Madhya Pradesh
India MPs 2004–2009
People from Shahdol
India MPs 1977–1979
India MPs 1989–1991
Lok Sabha members from Madhya Pradesh
India MPs 2014–2019
India MPs 1999–2004